The Informationsdienst gegen Rechtsextremismus (IDGR) (Information Service against Right-Wing Extremism) was a German-language internet portal devoted to collecting information about persons, organisations and publications which promote far-right extremism, antisemitism and Holocaust denial. It was founded in 1998 and maintained until 2006 by Margret Chatwin.
Right-wing critics have accused the IDGR of engaging in unduly exposing and defaming individuals on the political right, and of being associated with far-left extremism.

References

Further reading
 Albrecht Kolthoff: Der Informationsdienst gegen Rechtsextremismus (IDGR). In: Stephan Braun, Daniel Hörsch (Hrsg.): Rechte Netzwerke - eine Gefahr. VS - Verlag für Sozialwissenschaften, Wiesbaden, 2004, S. 231-242.  (in German)

Anti-fascism in Germany
Anti-nationalism in Europe
Defunct websites
Holocaust denial
Jewish German history